Brook Hollow Winery is a winery in the Columbia section of Knowlton Township in Warren County, New Jersey. Brook Hollow's original vineyard was first planted in 2002, and opened to the public in 2007. In 2013, the winery moved to a new location in Columbia. Brook Hollow has 8 acres of grapes under cultivation, and produces 1,050 cases of wine per year. The winery is named for a hollow created by Yards Creek, a stream that runs through the farm's original location.

Wines
Brook Hollow Winery is in the Warren Hills AVA, and produces wine from Cabernet Sauvignon, Cayuga White, Chambourcin, Chancellor, Chardonnay, Concord, Frontenac, Geneva Red, Merlot, Riesling, Vidal blanc, and Zinfandel grapes. Brook Hollow also makes fruit wines from cranberries. It is the only winery in New Jersey that produces wine from Geneva Red, which is a red hybrid grape developed in New York in 1947.

Licensing and associations
Brook Hollow has a farm winery license from the New Jersey Division of Alcoholic Beverage Control, which allows it to produce up to 50,000 gallons of wine per year, operate up to 15 off-premises sales rooms, and ship up to 12 cases per year to consumers in-state or out-of-state. The winery is a member of the Garden State Wine Growers Association and its subsidiary, Vintage North Jersey.

See also
Alcohol laws of New Jersey
American wine
Judgment of Princeton
List of wineries, breweries, and distilleries in New Jersey
New Jersey Farm Winery Act
New Jersey Wine Industry Advisory Council
New Jersey wine

References

External links
Garden State Wine Growers Association
Vintage North Jersey

Knowlton Township, New Jersey
Wineries in New Jersey
Tourist attractions in Warren County, New Jersey
2007 establishments in New Jersey